San Miguel-Team Pilipinas was the basketball team that represented the Philippines in international competitions from 2005 to 2007. The team was organized by the Philippine Basketball Association (PBA) during the period when the Basketball Association of the Philippines (BAP), the national sport association for basketball, was suspended by FIBA. The team was sponsored by San Miguel Corporation. San Miguel-Team Pilipinas was succeeded in 2009 by Powerade-Team Pilipinas, sponsored by Coca-Cola Bottlers Philippines, Inc.

The team represented the country in the 2005 FIBA Asia Champions Cup (fifth), the Las Vegas Global Hoop Summit (most exciting performing team), the William Jones Cup (third), and the 2005 Shell Rimula-Sultan Cup of Brunei (Champion). The team was bannered by Asi Taulava, Rommel Adducul, and Ren-Ren Ritualo. Unfortunately, the Philippines was suspended by the International Basketball Federation (FIBA) due to political conflict between leaders of the Philippine Olympic Committee (POC) and the Basketball Association of the Philippines (BAP).

In 2006, it finished sixth in the William Jones Cup and fourth in the Al-Emadi International Basketball Tournament, held at Doha, Qatar. The team has recently played in a goodwill series against Lebanon and won the Shell Rimula-Sultan Cup title in Brunei for the second year in a row.

After the FIBA suspension of the BAP was lifted in February 2007, the team underwent intensive training in the United States training camp that was attended before by NBA players. During the said training trip, they also played some tune up games with some NCAA teams.  Next stop for San Miguel–Team Pilipinas was the FIBA Asia Champions Cup 2007 held in Terhan, Iran. They played mostly against Arab teams that have two imports while they played without an import. After playing 8 games in 8 days, they finished 4th place in the tourney, a creditable showing as all the other teams played with imports.

List of Players

References

Defunct basketball teams in the Philippines
Basketball teams established in 2005
Basketball teams disestablished in 2007
2005 establishments in the Philippines
2007 disestablishments in the Philippines